Milutin Đurović (Cyrillic: Милутин Ђуровић; born 29 January 1974) is a Montenegrin brigadier general and the Chief of the General Staff of the Armed Forces of Montenegro since 16 April 2021.

References 

Montenegrin military personnel
Montenegrin generals
Living people

People from Bijelo Polje
1974 births